Martín Vassallo Argüello was the defending champion, but chose to compete in Acapulco at the same week.

Thomaz Bellucci won the title by defeating Eduardo Schwank 6–4, 7–6(7–3) in the final.

Seeds

Draw

Finals

Top half

Bottom half

References
 Main Draw (ATP)
 Qualifying Draw (ATP)
 ITF tournament profile

Providencia
2008